Andrew Rosen may refer to:

 Andrew S. Rosen, American chairman of Kaplan, Inc.
 Andrew Rosen (retail executive), American C.E.O. of Theory, Inc.